Collin Circelli (born October 25, 1981) is a Canadian professional ice hockey center who plays for the Grand Falls-Windsor Cataracts of the Newfoundland Senior Hockey League.

Playing career

Amateur
Collin Circelli played in the Ontario Junior Hockey League with the Oshawa Legionaires from 1998 to 2000, before he joined the Moncton Wildcats of the Quebec Major Junior Hockey League for two seasons. With the Wildcats, Circelli posted 128 points (45 goals, 83 assists) in 135 games. From 2002 to 2007, he played for the University of Saint Francis Xavier University in CIS .

Professional
Following the 2007 season, Circelli turned professional with the Wichita Thunder of the Central Hockey League. After eight games, he was acquired by the Odessa Jackalopes. He remained there until 2010 to play in Europe in the club Karlskrona HK in the Swedish Division 1 . He finishedhe finished top scorer 
on the team with 120goals and 240 assists in 37 regular season games. In 2011, he returned to the CHL with the Rapid City Rush.

On May 12, 2012, Circelli ventured back to Europe with Rapaces de Gap in the French Ligue Magnus for the 2012–2013 season.

After two seasons with Gap, Circelli opted to return to the CHL with the Missouri Mavericks on July 17, 2014.

On October 7, 2014, soon before the 2014–15 Central Hockey League season was set to begin, it was announced that the Central Hockey League ceased operations and the Mavericks, along with the Allen Americans, Brampton Beast, Quad City Mallards, Rapid City Rush, Tulsa Oilers, and Wichita Thunder, were all admitted to the ECHL for the 2014–15 ECHL season.  All Central Hockey League contracts that had already been signed by players for the 2014-15 Central Hockey League season were immediately nullified.

On October 17, 2014, Circelli signed with the Grand Falls-Windsor Cataracts of the Newfoundland Senior Hockey League.

Career statistics

References

External links

1981 births
Living people
Ice hockey people from Ontario
Karlskrona HK players
Moncton Wildcats players
Odessa Jackalopes players
Rapaces de Gap players
Rapid City Rush players
St. Francis Xavier University alumni
Sportspeople from Oshawa
Wichita Thunder players
Canadian ice hockey centres